The Canadian Broadcast Hall of Fame, started in 1982, recognizes Canadians in broadcasting or entertainment related industries who have "achieved outstanding success in helping raise industry standards from a material or humanitarian standpoint." The CAB Hall of Fame honours, in perpetuity, men and women whose contributions had demonstrated an extraordinary commitment to innovation, development and maintaining the highest standards of excellence in broadcasting generally, particularly in Canada. 

Candidates are nominated annually by Canada's five broadcasting associations and the executive committee of the Canadian Association of Broadcasters ("CAB"). The name of each inductee is inscribed in bronze on the Hall of Fame plaque at the CAB offices in Ottawa. Personalized plaques are also presented to either the inductees themselves or to their families.

Inductees include (partial list)
 Warren Barker (broadcaster), journalist and news director of CKNW from 1959-1991
Gerry Acton, former vice president,  Canadian Association of Broadcasters
 Bryan Adams, singer
Murray McIntyre (Jerry) Forbes
 Celine Dion, singer
 Dr. Charles A. Allard
 Marge Anthony, one of Canada's first female all-night DJs
 Randy Bachman, singer
 Walter J. Blackburn
 Rob Braide 
 Raynald Brière 
 Al A. Bruner 
 André Bureau
 George Chandler
 Shan Chandrasekar, president of the Asian Television Network
 Bruce Cockburn, singer
 Thomas E. Darling 
 Johnny Esaw, CTV's former vice president of sports
 Reginald Fessenden
 Barbara Frum
 Réal Giguère
 Harvey Glatt, founder of CHEZ-FM
 Harold Greenberg, founder of Astral Media
 Lorne Greene, actor
 Arthur W. Grieg 
 Bruce Hogle 
 Fred Latremouille 
 Donald Lawrie 
 Gordon Lightfoot, singer
 Robert (Bob) Lockhart, 
 Clarence Mack
 John Arthur Manning, pioneering broadcaster
 Arthur Andrew McDermott 
 Anne Murray, singer 
 Craig Oliver 
 Rai Purdy 
 Paul Reid 
 S. Campbell Ritchie
 John Roberts
 Lloyd Robertson
 Red Robinson
 Ted Rogers
 Gail Scott
 Gordon Sinclair  
 Ian Tyson 
 Phyllis Yaffe 
 Hal Yerxa

External links
 Canadian Broadcast Hall of Fame Inductees
 The Canadian Association of Broadcasters
 Canadian Communications Foundation 
 Canadian Communications Foundation

Science and technology halls of fame
Halls of fame in Canada
Television organizations in Canada
Radio organizations in Canada
Organizations established in 1982
1982 establishments in Canada